Ala ol Din or Ala od Din or Ala-ed-Din, also rendered as Alaeddin or Alaed Din, may refer to:
 Ala ol Din, Ardabil
 Ala ol Din-e Olya, Kerman Province
 Ala ol Din-e Sofla, Kerman Province